Gary Wesley Westfahl  (born May 7, 1951) is an American scholar of science fiction. He has written reviews for the Los Angeles Times, The Internet Review of Science Fiction and Locus Online. He worked at the University of California, Riverside until 2011 and is now an adjunct professor at the University of La Verne.

Personal life

Westfahl was born in Washington, DC, in 1951. In 1986, he graduated from Claremont University with a PhD in English.

He currently resides in Claremont, California, with his wife Lynne and cats Darwin and Skippy. His daughter, Allison, is a U.S. Attorney, his son-in-law, Steven Kong, is a doctor, and his son, Jeremy Anson, teaches mathematics at UC Irvine and has retired as a professional Super Smash Bros. Melee player known as Fly Amanita.

Work 

Westfahl coordinates English programs at the university's Learning Center and "has written or edited 24 books of scholarship on science fiction". He teaches science fiction, but has not written any. His wife Lynne is a professor in the theater department at Cal State Fullerton. Westfahl also taught at Heman G. Stark Correctional Facility for young adults, which closed in 2010.

Westfahl edited The Greenwood Encyclopedia of Science Fiction and Fantasy published in 2005. He also edited Science Fiction Quotations. Both books are described as useful and fun.

In his essay "For Tomorrow We Dine: The Sad Gourmet at the Scienticafe", Westfahl, co-editor of "Foods of the Gods: Eating and the Eaten in Fantasy and Science Fiction" (University of Georgia Press) discusses terrible food depicted even in "wonderful futures". He also notes the bland buildings and "overall atmosphere is one of cleanliness and sterility" resembling a hospital, attributing this to depictions of civilizations that "tend to maintain large populations" that "take on the characteristics of institutions."

He wrote the book The Mechanics of Wonder published in 1998 about the history of science fiction genres. A review in Utopian Studies called it "an important book for anyone who deals with the history of science fiction or the description, history, and/or historiography of genres and described it as dealing with a "Battle of the Books, a culture-skirmish between Old World and New World claims to (Science Fiction), between different approaches to scholarship, and on broader politics".

A review of his 2000 book, Science Fiction, Children's Literature and Popular Culture, says it offers strong and intelligent insights about a number of popular cultural forms, but that "the book does not offer any overarching argument" and is too personal in its approach to the subject.

His 2002 book Science Fiction, Canonization, Marginalization, and the Academy, written with George Slusser, "contends that scholars and critics exercise "control over literature" by deciding that some texts and genres should be "enshrined or 'canonized'" while others are marginalized ("exiled") from scholarship and literature classes."

Selected publications

The Spacesuit Film: A History, 1918-1969. Jefferson, NC, and London: McFarland & Company, 2012. 361 + x pp. paper. 
Editor. Science Fiction Quotations. New Haven: Yale University Press, 2005. 461 + xxi pp. paper. 
Editor. The Greenwood Encyclopedia of Science Fiction and Fantasy: Themes, Works, and Wonders. 3 volumes. Westport, CT: Greenwood Press, 2005. 1395 + xxix pp.
Science Fiction, Children's Literature and Popular Culture: Coming of Age in Fantasyland. Westport, CT: Greenwood Press, 2000. 157 pp.
The Mechanics of Wonder: The Creation of the Idea of Science Fiction. Liverpool: Liverpool UP, 1998. 344 pp. (cloth)
Gary Westfahl and George Slusser, eds. Science Fiction, Canonization, Marginalization, and the Academy.

Articles

 

ISFDB catalogs perhaps 100 publications.

References

External links
 
 
 

1951 births
Living people
Science fiction critics
American academics of English literature
American speculative fiction critics
American speculative fiction editors
Claremont Graduate University alumni
University of California, Riverside faculty
People from Washington, D.C.
20th-century American non-fiction writers
21st-century American non-fiction writers